Jon Secada is the English-language debut album by Cuban American pop singer Jon Secada, released in 1992. The album features four singles that reached the Top 40 on the US Billboard Hot 100 or the Top 10 on Billboard's Adult Contemporary chart, including "Just Another Day", which was also a big hit worldwide. The album sold six million copies worldwide and was certified 3× Platinum by the RIAA. It peaked at number 15 on the Billboard 200 album chart in March 1993.  At the 5th Lo Nuestro Awards, the album won the award for "Pop Album of the Year".

Track listing
All songs written by Jon Secada and Miguel A. Morejon, except as noted.

 "Just Another Day" – 5:25
 "Dreams That I Carry" – 4:46
 "Angel" – 4:34
 "Do You Believe in Us" – 3:58
 "One of a Kind" – 4:02 (Secada)
 "Time Heals" – 4:24 (Willy Perez Feria)
 "Do You Really Want Me" – 4:04
 "Misunderstood" – 4:22 (Secada, Scott Shapiro, Tom McWilliams, Jo Pat Cafaro)
 "Always Something" – 4:13 (Secada, Clay Ostwald, Jorge Casas)
 "I'm Free" – 4:01
 "Otro Día Más Sin Verte" (Spanish version of Just Another Day) – 5:27 (Secada, Morejon, Gloria Estefan)
 "Angel" (Spanish Version) – 4:35 (Secada, Morejon, Estefan)

Personnel

Musicians

Ed Calle – flute (5)
Jorge Casas – bass (3, 4, 7, 9, 10, 12), programming & arrangements (6, 9), fretless bass (6)
Rouge Cougu – percussion & shaker (10)
John DeFaria – guitar (2, 3, 6, 7, 9, 12)
Mark Dowdle – vocal intro (9)
Emilio Estefan, Jr. – accordion (5)
Gloria Estefan – background vocals (1, 11)
Anita Faye Green – background vocals (2, 7–10)
Rafael Falcon – additional drum programming (1, 4, 11), additional programming (5)
Charlotte McKinnon – background vocals (7, 8, 9)

Tom McWilliams – additional drum programming (4), programming & arrangements (8)
Miguel A. Morejon – programming & arrangements (1-5, 7, 10–12)
Clay Ostwald – additional programming (3, 4, 8, 12); keyboards, programming & arrangements (6, 9); clavinet (8)
Rafael Padilla – shaker (1, 3, 4, 8, 11, 12), percussion (2, 5, 6, 9), tambourine (4, 12)
Rita Quintero – background vocals (5)
Jon Secada – lead vocals (all tracks), background vocals (1, 2, 4–11)
Scott Shapiro – guitar solo (8), programming & arrangements (8)
Rene Luis Toledo – guitar (3, 10), guitar solo (12)

Production
Jorge Casas – producer
Lazaro Cuervo – make-up
Mark Dowdle – engineer
Charles Dye – engineer
Emilio Estefan, Jr. – producer
Bob Ludwig – mastering at Masterdisk (New York, NY)
Henry Marquez – art direction
John Patterson – engineer
Freddy Piñero, Jr – engineer
Clay Ostwald – producer, engineer
Phil Ramone – mixing (1, 3, 11, 12)
Alberto Tolot – cover photo
Tim White – other photography
Patrice Wilkinson Levinsohn – engineer
Paco – hair stylist
Mike Couzzi – engineer, mixing (2, 3, 4, 6, 9)
Ron Taylor – engineer
Carla Leighton – design
Eric Schilling – engineer, mixing (5, 7, 8, 10, 12)

Charts

Weekly charts

Year-end charts

All-time charts

Sales and certifications

See also
List of number-one Billboard Latin Pop Albums from the 1990s

References

1992 debut albums
Jon Secada albums
SBK Records albums